The Black River is a tributary of the Cape Fear River, approximately 50 mi (80 km) long, in southeastern North Carolina in the United States.

It is formed in southern Sampson County, approximately 15 mi. (24 km) south of Clinton, by confluence of two creeks: Great Coharie Creek and Six Runs Creek. It flows SSE, receiving the South River approximately 30 mi (48 km) south of Clinton. It flows southeast through Pender County, past the Moores Creek National Battlefield, and joins the Cape Fear approximately 10 mi (16 km) northwest of Wilmington, near the broadening of the Cape Fear into a tidal estuary.

The river is known for having a wide variety of fish species, ranging from several types of sunfish and catfish, as well as largemouth bass. Ancient Bald cypress trees in excess of 2600 years old were discovered along the river in 2019.

History 
Long before settlers were navigating the Black River corridor in the eighteenth century, Native Americans traveled through these waterways via canoes. By the nineteenth century following the Civil War, the U.S. Army Corps of Engineers helped dredge the river in preparation for steamboats to have access to it. This would allow materials and goods such as lumber, grains, and livestock to be more easily transported by boat through the Black River.

Geography

Three Sisters 
The Three Sisters swamp is located off the State Road 1550 bridge and the N.C. 53 bridge with the approximate coordinates of 34°33'59.2"N 78°15'14.7"W. This swamp is located on the Black River in Bladen County and the only way to reach Three Sisters is through the use of canoes and kayaks. The swamp is approximately one mile long and a half mile wide, but is home to the largest cluster of ancient cypress trees in the entire Black River Preserve.

Ecology 
The Black River is part of a blackwater system which is nutrient-poor and more acidic than other types of freshwater ecosystems. The higher acidity is a result of vegetation decay and the subsequent release of tannins in the water. This makes for an environment that does not sustain most hardwood tree species and even slows the growth of bald cypress. Although its blackwater prevents certain organisms from flourishing in the Black River Preserve, these types of ecosystems often consist of a very unique variety of fauna and flora.

Within the Black River lives a rare species of fish called the Santee chub (Cyprinella zanema). Another rare fish is the Broadtail Madtom. Although both of these species are uncommon, their current status is neither endangered nor threatened.

Ancient bald cypress 
The Black River in North Carolina is the only location in the world where bald cypress (Taxodium distichum) have existed for over a millennium. In 2019, an individual tree—dating back to 605 B.C.E—was discovered alongside this southeastern tributary. Ancient bald cypresses were determined to be the oldest trees in eastern North America, as well as the fifth oldest species of tree on Earth.

In order to determine the age of bald cypress trees on the Black River Preserve, scientists have used a non-destructive method combining radiocarbon dating and dendrochronology. An individual by the name of David Stahle, was one of those who used the technology to date some of the oldest standing cypresses located in the area of Three Sisters swamp. This technology provides important information regarding the adaptability of the Black River ecosystem through historical variations in climate and rainfall patterns.

Recreation 
In 1994, the Black River was deemed an Outstanding Water Source by the North Carolina Division of Parks and Recreation. It has since become a popular location for recreational activities such as kayaking and canoeing. Year round, boaters can observe a wide variety of plant and animal species along the riverbanks.

Conservation 
When it comes to conservation, The Nature Conservancy (TNC) is the longest running supporter of the Black River. TNC is largely responsible for establishing more than 17,000 acres for the Black River Preserve. With the help of North Carolina state agencies, this conservation and restoration project began in 1989 and has since protected the river and its surrounding environment.

The Black River is an area of focus for environmentalists due to threats on the ecosystem posed by humans. These threats include pollution of the river and surrounding waterways, as well as the logging industry, climate change and rise in sea level.

See also

 List of North Carolina rivers

References

Further reading

External links
 

Rivers of North Carolina
Rivers of Sampson County, North Carolina
Rivers of New Hanover County, North Carolina
Rivers of Pender County, North Carolina
Tributaries of the Cape Fear River